The Last Bus is a British science fiction  adventure television series created by Paul Neafcy for Netflix. The series consists of ten episodes and premiered on Netflix on 1 April 2022. The show stars Moosa Mostafa, Phoebe De Silva, Daniel Frogson, Lauryn Ajufo, Marlie Morrelle, Nathanael Saleh and Carys John with guest appearances by Tom Basden, Lara McDonnell and Robert Sheehan. The show follows a group of children who are the last people on Earth when a famous scientist creates orbs that vaporise everybody on the planet. It received generally positive reviews, with praise for its style, story, casting, musical score, screenplay and emotional weight, but were divided with the acting, characters, and comparisons to Stranger Things.

Plot
A group of mismatched school kids band together to face a fearsome new machine intelligence.

Cast
 Moosa Mostafa as Nasir Roman, a gifted 12 year-old boy who is obsessed with Dalton Monkhouse.
 Phoebe De Silva as Sophie Roman, Nas's older sister who always tries to take care of him.
 Daniel Frogson as Thomas Little, a lonely boy whose mother hates him and father died when he was 10.
 Lauryn Ajufo as Misha Morris, a rebellious girl who is best friends with Sophie.
 Marlie Morrelle as Chelsea, a perfect girl who always tries to get everyone to follow the rules.
 Nathanael Saleh as Joshua Collins, a goofy boy who mostly cares about his sick mother.
 Carys John as Bethan Conner, a song-loving 12 year-old girl who is best friends with Josh.
 Curtis Kantsa as Danny Adeyemi, a bully who is friends with Tom.
 Robert Sheehan as Dalton Monkhouse, a genius scientist who has his new invention, Genie Orbs, put everyone on the planet in stasis.
 Tom Basden as Mr. Short, a teacher at Braelawn Academy.
 Lara McDonnell as Lucy Monkhouse, Dalton's 16 year-old daughter whom he abandoned.

Episodes

Production

Development 
Pre-production began in August 2020.

Filming 
Filming began by September 2020 in Portishead. Filming also occurred at Redcliffe Caves, Bristol, The Bottle Yard Studios, and other locations in South West England. Filming began at Clifton Down in February 2021. Braelawn Academy was made up of three schools: Writhlington School, Nailsea School and Badminton School. Filming also took place at The Eden Project, Cheddar Gorge, the Forest of Dean, Wookey Hole Caves and amusement parks in Brean.

Marketing
On 4 March 2022, Netflix released an official trailer for the series and announced that the series was set to premiere on 1 April 2022.

References

External links 
 
 

English-language Netflix original programming
2020s British science fiction television series
2022 British television series debuts
British adventure television series
Buses in fiction
Television series about teenagers
Television shows filmed in England
British science fiction adventure television series
Netflix children's programming